Rodrigo Fernández Cedrés (born 3 January 1996) is a Uruguayan footballer who plays as midfielder for Brazilian club Santos.

Club career

Danubio
Born in Montevideo, Fernández was a Danubio youth graduate, having joined their youth setup in 2009. He made his first team – and Primera División – debut on 3 September 2016, starting in a 1–2 away loss against Rampla Juniors. The following 9 August, after already establishing himself as a starter, he renewed his contract with the club.

Guaraní
On 17 December 2018, Fernández moved abroad and signed for Paraguayan Primera División side Guaraní, on loan for one year. An immediate first-choice, he scored his first professional goal on 4 October 2019, netting the equalizer in a 1–1 home draw against Libertad.

In November 2019, Fernández stated his interest on remaining at the club for the following season, and Guaraní announced the permanent contract of Fernández until 2022 in December, after buying 50% of his economic rights.

Santos

On 29 March 2022, Fernández agreed to a loan deal with Campeonato Brasileiro Série A side Santos until the end of the year, with a buyout clause. He made his debut on 5 April, starting in a 0–1 Copa Sudamericana away loss against Banfield.

Fernández scored his first goal for Peixe on 12 May 2022, netting his team's third in a 3–0 Copa do Brasil home win over Coritiba. He was a regular starter for the club until the end of the year, and featured in 38 matches overall during the season.

On 6 December 2022, Fernández signed a permanent three-year contract with Santos, as the club activated his buyout clause.

Career statistics

References

External links

Santos FC profile 

1996 births
Living people
Footballers from Montevideo
Uruguayan footballers
Association football midfielders
Uruguayan Primera División players
Paraguayan Primera División players
Campeonato Brasileiro Série A players
Danubio F.C. players
Club Guaraní players
Santos FC players
Uruguayan expatriate footballers
Uruguayan expatriate sportspeople in Paraguay
Uruguayan expatriate sportspeople in Brazil
Expatriate footballers in Paraguay
Expatriate footballers in Brazil